The 2020 YellaWood 500 was a NASCAR Cup Series race held on October 4, 2020 at Talladega Superspeedway in Lincoln, Alabama. Contested over 200 laps -- extended from 188 laps due to an overtime finish, on the 2.66 mile (4.2 km) superspeedway, it was the 31st race of the 2020 NASCAR Cup Series season, the fifth race of the Playoffs, and the second race of the Round of 12.

Report

Background

Talladega Superspeedway, originally known as Alabama International Motor Superspeedway (AIMS), is a motorsports complex located north of Talladega, Alabama. It is located on the former Anniston Air Force Base in the small city of Lincoln. The track is a tri-oval and was constructed in the 1960s by the International Speedway Corporation, a business controlled by the France family. Talladega is most known for its steep banking and the unique location of the start/finish line that's located just past the exit to pit road. The track currently hosts the NASCAR series such as the NASCAR Cup Series, Xfinity Series and the Gander RV & Outdoors Truck Series. Talladega is the longest NASCAR oval with a length of  tri-oval like the Daytona International Speedway, which also is a  tri-oval.

Entry list
 (R) denotes rookie driver.
 (i) denotes driver who are ineligible for series driver points.

Qualifying
Denny Hamlin was awarded the pole for the race as determined by competition-based formula.

Starting Lineup

Race

Stage Results

Stage One
Laps: 60

Stage Two
Laps: 60

Final Stage Results

Stage Three
Laps: 80 (was originally 68, but got extended due to Overtime)

Race statistics
 Lead changes: 58 among 18 different drivers
 Cautions/Laps: 13 for 54 laps
 Red flags: 2 for 21 minutes and 19 seconds
 Time of race: 4 hours, 5 minutes and 58 seconds
 Average speed:

Track limits controversy

Track limits are used at Daytona, Talladega, and the road courses.  Officiating by NASCAR officials involving the finish of the race generated in regards to track limits drew considerable controversy afterwards. Initially, second-place finisher Matt DiBenedetto and sixth-place finisher Chase Elliott were penalized and moved to 21st and 22nd positions, respectively. NASCAR penalized DiBenedetto for forcing William Byron beyond track limits, marked with a double yellow line at the bottom of the track, and the sanctioning body penalized Elliott for voluntarily moving under the line. NASCAR later redistributed its penalty originally given to Elliott, assessing it to Chris Buescher for forcing Elliott beyond track limits. Race winner Denny Hamlin also maneuvered under the track limits boundaries on the final corner, but race officials ruled that he was avoiding a potential accident from DiBenedetto and Byron. Despite myriad negative reactions to the decision at Talladega and online, a NASCAR official later said that the rulings were "clear-cut". NBC commentators Dale Earnhardt Jr. and Dale Jarrett called for NASCAR to remove track limits, but the sanctioning body, citing safety concerns, said the rule would stay in place.

Media

Television
NBC Sports covered the race on the television side. Rick Allen, Jeff Burton and six-time Talladega winner Dale Earnhardt Jr. called the action from the booth at Charlotte Motor Speedway, which was the last time this setup would be used, as starting with the next race booth commentators started calling races on site. Steve Letarte called the action on site. Dave Burns, Marty Snider and Kelli Stavast handled the pit road duties on site.

Radio
MRN had the radio call for the race, which was also simulcasted on Sirius XM NASCAR Radio. Alex Hayden and Jeff Striegle called the race for MRN when the field races thru the tri-oval. Dave Moody called the action from turn 1, Mike Bagley called the action for MRN when the field races down the backstraightaway, and Dan Hubbard called the race from the Sunoco tower just outside of turn 4. Winston Kelley and Steve Post called the action for MRN from pit lane.

Standings after the race

Drivers' Championship standings

Manufacturers' Championship standings

Note: Only the first 16 positions are included for the driver standings.

References

2020 in sports in Alabama
2020 NASCAR Cup Series
NASCAR races at Talladega Superspeedway
October 2020 sports events in the United States
2020 YellaWood 500